South Toms River is a borough in Ocean County, New Jersey, United States. As of the 2020 United States census, the borough's population was 3,643, a decrease of 41 (−1.1%) from the 2010 census count of 3,684, which in turn reflected an increase of 50 (+1.4%) from the 3,634 counted in the 2000 census.

South Toms River was incorporated as a borough by an act of the New Jersey Legislature on March 28, 1927, from portions of Berkeley Township, based on the results of a referendum held on May 3, 1927. The borough was named for the Toms River and the neighboring community of Toms River, which were named for Capt. William Tom.

Geography
According to the United States Census Bureau, the borough had a total area of 1.21 square miles (3.13 km2), including 1.16 square miles (3.00 km2) of land and 0.05 square miles (0.13 km2) of water (4.21%).

The borough borders the Ocean County municipalities of Beachwood, Berkeley Township and Toms River.

South Toms River sits on the south side of the Toms River, across from Toms River Township. The borough is one of 11 municipalities in Ocean County that are part of the Toms River watershed.

Demographics

2010 census

The Census Bureau's 2006–2010 American Community Survey showed that (in 2010 inflation-adjusted dollars) median household income was $60,408 (with a margin of error of +/− $6,382) and the median family income was $62,750 (+/− $8,524). Males had a median income of $46,370 (+/− $4,313) versus $36,133 (+/− $2,994) for females. The per capita income for the borough was $19,177 (+/− $2,685). About 17.2% of families and 22.4% of the population were below the poverty line, including 33.6% of those under age 18 and 11.5% of those age 65 or over.

2000 census
As of the 2000 United States census there were 3,634 people, 1,073 households, and 902 families residing in the borough. The racial makeup of the borough was 72.56% White, 21.16% African American, 0.14% Native American, 0.69% Asian, 2.50% from other races, and 2.94% from two or more races. Hispanic or Latino of any race were 9.27% of the population.

There were 1,073 households, out of which 43.1% had children under the age of 18 living with them, 55.2% were married couples living together, 22.7% had a female householder with no husband present, and 15.9% were non-families. 12.5% of all households were made up of individuals, and 5.4% had someone living alone who was 65 years of age or older. The average household size was 3.39 and the average family size was 3.63.

In the borough the population was spread out, with 32.1% under the age of 18, 9.3% from 18 to 24, 29.2% from 25 to 44, 20.4% from 45 to 64, and 9.0% who were 65 years of age or older. The median age was 32 years. For every 100 females, there were 93.1 males. For every 100 females age 18 and over, there were 88.5 males.

The median income for a household in the borough was $43,468, and the median income for a family was $45,375. Males had a median income of $31,859 versus $24,837 for females. The per capita income for the borough was $16,292. About 11.2% of families and 12.6% of the population were below the poverty line, including 18.4% of those under age 18 and 18.3% of those age 65 or over.

Government

Local government
South Toms River is governed under the Borough form of New Jersey municipal government, which is used in 218 municipalities (of the 564) statewide, making it the most common form of government in New Jersey. The governing body is comprised of the Mayor and the Borough Council, with all positions elected at-large on a partisan basis as part of the November general election. The Mayor is elected directly by the voters to a four-year term of office. The Borough Council is comprised of six members elected to serve three-year terms on a staggered basis, with two seats coming up for election each year in a three-year cycle. The Borough form of government used by South Toms River is a "weak mayor / strong council" government in which council members act as the legislative body with the mayor presiding at meetings and voting only in the event of a tie. The mayor can veto ordinances subject to an override by a two-thirds majority vote of the council. The mayor makes committee and liaison assignments for council members, and most appointments are made by the mayor with the advice and consent of the council.

, the Mayor of South Toms River Borough is Republican Oscar Cradle, whose term of office ends December 31, 2026. Members of the Borough Council are Edward F. Murray (R, 2023), Kayla Rolzhausen (R, 2023), Samuel S. Fennell (R, 2024), Tanya M. Mosley (R, 2025), Thomas Rolzhausen (R, 2025),Council President Sandford Ross Jr. (R, 2023).

Federal, state, and county representation
South Toms River is located in the 4th Congressional District and is part of New Jersey's 9th state legislative district. 

Prior to the 2011 reapportionment following the 2010 Census, South Toms River had been in the 10th state legislative district.

 

Ocean County is governed by a Board of County Commissioners comprised of five members who are elected on an at-large basis in partisan elections and serving staggered three-year terms of office, with either one or two seats coming up for election each year as part of the November general election. At an annual reorganization held in the beginning of January, the board chooses a Director and a Deputy Director from among its members. , Ocean County's Commissioners (with party affiliation, term-end year and residence) are:

Commissioner Director John P. Kelly (R, 2022, Eagleswood Township),
Commissioner Deputy Director Virginia E. Haines (R, 2022, Toms River),
Barbara Jo Crea (R, 2024, Little Egg Harbor Township)
Gary Quinn (R, 2024, Lacey Township) and
Joseph H. Vicari (R, 2023, Toms River). Constitutional officers elected on a countywide basis are 
County Clerk Scott M. Colabella (R, 2025, Barnegat Light),
Sheriff Michael G. Mastronardy (R, 2022; Toms River) and
Surrogate Jeffrey Moran (R, 2023, Beachwood).

Politics
As of March 2011, there were a total of 2,065 registered voters in South Toms River, of which 562 (27.2%) were registered as Democrats, 345 (16.7%) were registered as Republicans and 1,157 (56.0%) were registered as Unaffiliated. There was one voter registered to another party. Among the borough's 2010 Census population, 56.1% (vs. 63.2% in Ocean County) were registered to vote, including 77.9% of those ages 18 and over (vs. 82.6% countywide).

In the 2012 presidential election, Democrat Barack Obama received 64.6% of the vote (802 cast), ahead of Republican Mitt Romney with 33.1% (411 votes), and other candidates with 2.3% (28 votes), among the 1,257 ballots cast by the borough's 2,149 registered voters (16 ballots were spoiled), for a turnout of 58.5%. In the 2008 presidential election, Democrat Barack Obama received 60.9% of the vote (879 cast), ahead of Republican John McCain with 36.9% (533 votes) and other candidates with 1.4% (20 votes), among the 1,443 ballots cast by the borough's 2,233 registered voters, for a turnout of 64.6%. In the 2004 presidential election, Republican George W. Bush received 49.1% of the vote (627 ballots cast), outpolling Democrat John Kerry with 48.6% (621 votes) and other candidates with 1.1% (22 votes), among the 1,277 ballots cast by the borough's 2,073 registered voters, for a turnout percentage of 61.6.

In the 2013 gubernatorial election, Republican Chris Christie received 66.3% of the vote (473 cast), ahead of Democrat Barbara Buono with 31.8% (227 votes), and other candidates with 1.8% (13 votes), among the 736 ballots cast by the borough's 2,072 registered voters (23 ballots were spoiled), for a turnout of 35.5%. In the 2009 gubernatorial election, Republican Chris Christie received 52.8% of the vote (431 ballots cast), ahead of  Democrat Jon Corzine with 37.0% (302 votes), Independent Chris Daggett with 6.1% (50 votes) and other candidates with 1.8% (15 votes), among the 816 ballots cast by the borough's 2,157 registered voters, yielding a 37.8% turnout.

Education
Public school students in kindergarten through twelfth grade attend the Toms River Regional Schools, a regional public school district based primarily in Toms River Township that also serves students from Beachwood, Pine Beach and South Toms River. The district's board of education has nine members; seats are allocated based on population, with one seat allocated to South Toms River. As of the 2018–19 school year, the district, comprised of 18 schools, had an enrollment of 15,472 students and 1,171.6 classroom teachers (on an FTE basis), for a student–teacher ratio of 13.2:1.

Transportation

Roads and highways

The Garden State Parkway bisects the borough, connecting Beachwood to the south and Berkeley Township to the north, and includes Interchange 80.
U.S. Route 9 heads from Beachwood to the east and begins a concurrency with the Garden State Parkway at exit 80. County Route 530 (Dover Road / South Main Street) traverses the borough from Berkeley Township to the southwest to its eastern terminus just over the border with Toms River Township. Route 166 (Main Street) clips the northeastern corner of the borough, running from Beachwood in the south to Toms River in the north.

Public transportation
NJ Transit provides bus service between the borough and Atlantic City on the 559 bus route.

References

External links

 Borough of South Toms River
 Manitou Park Fire Company – Station 18
 Toms River Regional Schools
 
 School Data for the Toms River Regional Schools, National Center for Education Statistics

 
1927 establishments in New Jersey
Borough form of New Jersey government
Boroughs in Ocean County, New Jersey
Populated places established in 1927